A second fiddle is a fiddle that supplements the first fiddle in the string section of an orchestra. It may also refer to a subordinate or assistant role (for example that of a sidekick).

Second Fiddle may refer to:
 Second Fiddle (1923 film), a 1923 silent film comedy-drama
 Second Fiddle (1939 film), a 1939 American musical romance film
 Second Fiddle (1957 film), a 1957 British comedy film 
 Second Fiddle (novel), by Mary Wesley
 "Second Fiddle", an episode of British television series Lovejoy
 Second Fiddle (song), a song recorded by Kay Starr that was #40 on the U.S. charts in 1956

See also
 "Second Fiddle (To an Old Guitar)", a 1964 song by American country music artist Jean Shepard